The Italian Serie A, officially named Serie A Gold, is the highest level men's handball league of Italy.

Competition format 

The league has 14 teams playing against each other in a round-robin tournament. The champion is determined by playoffs between the top four teams at the end of the regular season. The team ranked last at the end of the regular season, as well as the losing team of the playouts, are relegated to Serie A2.

2022/23 Season participants 

The following 14 clubs compete in the Serie A during the 2022-23 season.

Serie A past champions

 1970 : Buscaglione Roma
 1971 : HC Flaminio Genovesi Roma
 1972 : CUS Verona
 1973 : C.S. Esercito Roma
 1974 : HC Rovereto
 1975 : HC Rovereto (2)
 1976 : Pallamano Trieste
 1977 : Pallamano Trieste (2)
 1978 : HC Rovereto (3)
 1979 : Pallamano Trieste (3)
 1980 : HC Rovereto (4)
 1981 : Pallamano Trieste (4)
 1982 : Pallamano Trieste (5)
 1983 : Pallamano Trieste (6)
 1984 : HC Scafati
 1985 : Pallamano Trieste (7)
 1986 : Pallamano Trieste (8)
 1987 : CC Ortigia Siracusa
 1988 : CC Ortigia Siracusa (2)
 1989 : CC Ortigia Siracusa (3)
 1990 : Pallamano Trieste (9)
 1991 : SSV Brixen Handball
 1992 : SSV Brixen Handball (2)
 1993 : Pallamano Trieste (10)
 1994 : Pallamano Trieste (11)
 1995 : Pallamano Trieste (12)
 1996 : Pallamano Trieste (13)
 1997 : Pallamano Trieste (14)
 1998 : Pallamano Prato
 1999 : Pallamano Prato (2)
 2000 : Pallamano Trieste (15)
 2001 : Pallamano Trieste (16)
 2002 : Pallamano Trieste (17)
 2003 : Handball Club Conversano
 2004 : Handball Club Conversano (2)
 2005 : SC Merano
 2006 : Handball Club Conversano (3)
 2007 : Handball Casarano
 2008 : Handball Casarano (2)
 2009 : Handball Casarano (3)
 2010 : Handball Club Conversano (4)
 2011 : Handball Club Conversano (5) 
 2012 : SSV Bozen Loacker
 2013 : SSV Bozen Loacker (2) 
 2014 : Junior Fasano 
 2015 : SSV Bozen Loacker (3)
 2016 : Junior Fasano (2)
 2017 : SSV Bozen Loacker (4)
 2018 : Junior Fasano (3)
 2019 : SSV Bozen Loacker (5)
 2020 : not assigned
 2021 : Handball Club Conversano (6) 
 2022 : Handball Club Conversano (7)

EHF coefficient ranking
For the season 2022/2023:

34.  (42)  Meistriliiga (9.00)
35.  (36)  SynotTip Virsliga (7.33)
36.  (38)  Serie A (4.33)
37.  (33)  GHR A (3.33)
38.  (34)  Multiple ones (2.67)

External links
 Official website

References

Serie A
Italy
Handball